George Allison Wilson (April 1, 1884 – September 8, 1953) was an American politician and lawyer. He was a United States Senator and 28th Governor of Iowa.

Personal background
Born on a farm near Menlo, Iowa, Wilson attended rural schools, and Grinnell College in Grinnell, Iowa. He graduated from the University of Iowa College of Law at Iowa City in 1907, and was admitted to the bar the same year. He then commenced practice in Des Moines. He was assistant county attorney of Polk County, Iowa from 1912 to 1914 and the Polk County Attorney from 1915 to 1916. He was a district judge from 1917 to 1921 and was a member of the Iowa Senate from 1927 to 1936.

Iowa Governor and U.S. Senator
In 1936, Iowa's governor, Democrat Clyde Herring, ran for the U.S. Senate instead of running for re-election. Wilson won the Republican nomination to succeed him as governor, but was defeated by Democrat Nelson G. Kraschel in the general election by fewer than 3,000 votes out of over one million cast.

In 1938, Wilson again ran against Kraschel, with the opposite result. Wilson received 52.7 percent of the vote. Wilson was then re-elected as governor in 1940, winning again by 52.7 percent in the general election over Democrat John Valentine after overcoming a surprisingly strong challenge in the Republican primary from future Congressman H.R. Gross.

Instead of running for a third term in 1942, Wilson decided to challenge Senator Clyde L. Herring, and defeated him. He served in the Senate from January 14, 1943, to January 3, 1949. His Senate committees included the Committee on Small Business and the Armed Services Committee.

In 1948, former U.S. Senator Guy M. Gillette, unseated in his own bid for re-election in 1944, ran against Wilson in the general election. Wilson was expected to win. However, in a year in which President Harry S. Truman and many other Democrats surprised pundits, Gillette defeated Wilson by over 150,000 votes.

After the Senate
After leaving the Senate in early 1949, Wilson returned to the practice of law.

Wilson died in Des Moines in 1953, and was interred in Glendale Cemetery.

References

1884 births
1953 deaths
Republican Party Iowa state senators
Iowa state court judges
Republican Party governors of Iowa
Grinnell College alumni
University of Iowa College of Law alumni
People from Guthrie County, Iowa
Republican Party United States senators from Iowa
20th-century American judges
20th-century American politicians
20th-century American lawyers